The Next 36 is an entrepreneurship initiative founded in 2010  to identify and train promising Canadian entrepreneurs.  The program selects 36 university students per year to work in an intense program and receive advice from Canadian business experts.

References

External links

 The Next 36 – Official The Next 36 Homepage

Business organizations based in Canada
Entrepreneurship organizations